The Ukraine national under-21 football team is also known as Youth [football] team of Ukraine is one of junior national football teams of Ukraine for participation in under-21 international competitions. The team is managed by the Ukrainian Association of Football staff, committee of national teams. The team participates in qualifications to the Olympic competitions and the continental (UEFA) U-21 competitions.

Their first game the team played was on October 28, 1992. Its first competition the team entered in 1994 the qualification round for the 1996 European Under-21 Championship. The team has qualified for a tournament twice. The under-21s also qualified to the 2011 UEFA European Under-21 Championship that was held in Denmark.

History
Its first game under national flag the team played on 28 October 1992 by hosting Belarus national under-21 football team in a friendly game in Ternopil (Ternopil City Stadium). The game ended in scoreless tie and was attended by 4,000 people. The initial squad consisted of following players Sergei Aleksandrov, Dmytro Parfenov, Serhiy Fedorov, Oleksandr Koval, Vladyslav Vashchuk, Vitaliy Kosovskyi, Ihor Luchkevych, Serhiy Onopko, Vladimir Lebed, Hennadiy Moroz, Vitaliy Pushkutsa, Kostyantyn Pinchuk, Oleg Solovyov, Ruslan Romanchuk, Oleksandr Karabuta. Later two out of the squad Lebed and Aleksandrov continued to play for Russian national teams.

In August 1993, the Ukraine youth squad took part in its first tournament where it contested few teams outside of Europe. Its first competitive tournament became the Youth Euro 1996 where it was eliminated in qualification group. Its first game Ukraine U-21 played at home against its opponents from Lithuania on 6 September 1994. 

It took Ukraine another 10 years to finally qualify to the tournament final when in 2006 it almost won the tournament losing in the final game to Netherlands which earned its first title instead.

Tournaments

UEFA U-21 Championship
Since 1984, it is an official U-21 European championship. Since 1992, the tournament doubles as qualifying competition for the Olympic Games every four years.
 1994: Did not enter.
 1996: Did not qualify. Finished 2nd of 6 in qualification group.
 1998: Did not qualify. Finished 2nd of 5 in qualification group.
 2000: Did not qualify. Finished 3rd of 5 in qualification group.
 2002: Did not qualify. Finished 1st of 5 in qualification group. Lost qualification play-off to Switzerland.
 2004: Did not qualify. Finished 3rd of 6 in qualification group.
 2006: Runner-up. Finished 2nd of 7 in qualification group. Won qualification play-off over Belgium.
 2007: Did not qualify. Finished 2nd of 3 in qualification group.
 2009: Did not qualify. Finished 2nd of 5 in qualification group.
 2011: Group Stage. Finished 1st of 5 in qualification group. Won qualification play-off over Netherlands
 2013: Did not qualify. Finished 3rd of 6 in qualification group.
 2015: Did not qualify. Finished 2nd of 5 in qualification group. Lost qualification play-off to Germany.
 2017: Did not qualify. Finished 4th of 6 in qualification group.
 2019: Did not qualify. Finished 3rd of 6 in qualification group.
 2021: Did not qualify. Finished 3rd of 6 in qualification group.
 2023: Qualified. Finished 2nd of 6 in qualification group. Won qualification play-off over Slovakia.

UEFA U-21 European Championship record

Olympic qualification
Since 1992, the olympic roster may consist out of under-23 year old players, plus three over the age players.
 1996: Did not qualify. Eliminated in European qualifications.
 2000: Did not qualify. Eliminated in European qualifications.
 2004: Did not qualify. Eliminated in European qualifications.
 2008: Did not qualify. Eliminated in European qualifications.
 2012: Did not qualify. Finished 4th of 4 in Group Stage of the UEFA final tournament.
 2016: Did not qualify. Eliminated in European qualifications.
 2020: Did not qualify. Eliminated in European qualifications.

Important friendlies

Lobanovsky tournament (2006– )

 Winners (2): 2009, 2019
 Runners-up (4): 2011, 2013, 2015, 2017

Commonwealth of Independent States Cup (2012–2014)

 Winner (1): 2014
 Runner-up (1): 2013

Head coaches

Coaching staff
Currently approved:

UEFA European Under-21 Championship

2023 UEFA European Under-21 Championship qualification

2023 UEFA European Under-21 Championship play-offs 

The four play-off winners qualify for the final tournament.

All times are CEST (UTC+2), as listed by UEFA (local times, if different, are in parentheses).

|}

Results and fixtures

2022

2023

Players

Current squad
 Match dates: 24 and 27 March 2023
 Opposition: matches vs  and 
Caps and goals correct as of: 21 November 2022, after the match vs .

Recent call-ups
The following players have been called up for the team within the last 12 months.

Notes
INJ = Player withdrew from the squad because of injury.
WD = Player withdrew from the squad due to non-injury issue.
RES = Reserves squad – replaces a member of the squad in case of injury/unavailability.

Head-to-head record

The following table shows Ukraine Under-21s all-time international record, correct as of 29 March 2021.

Serbia and Montenegro +1=1-1 2-4 (Yugoslavia)
Kyrgyzstan national +1=0-0 4-0
Norway u-23 +0=0-1 0-2
England C +0=0-1 0-2

Home venues record
Since the game Ukraine v Belarus (28 October 1992), Ukraine youth team have played their home games at 19 different stadiums. 

Last updated: 2 June 2016. Statistics include official FIFA-recognised matches only.

See also
 Ukraine national football team
 European Under-21 Football Championship
 2006 UEFA European Under-21 Football Championship
 2006 UEFA Under-21 Championship Finalists

Notes

References

External links

 Official website of the Ukrainian Association of Football Under-21 Team
 Official website of the Ukrainian Association of Football Under-21 Team full results archive
 UEFA Under-21 website Contains full results archive
 UEFA Ukraine U-21 page Contains rosters and photographs.
 The Rec.Sport.Soccer Statistics Foundation Contains full record of U-21/U-23 Championships.
 Andrei Kudyrko. The Ukrainian youth: 1973 – 1983. Generation after generation (Украинская молодежь: 1973 - 1983. Поколение за поколением). UA-Football. 7 June 2006.

 
European national under-21 association football teams
Youth football in Ukraine